The following highways are numbered 663:

Canada

Norway
 Norwegian County Road 663

United States